Maria Sund is a Swedish paralympic alpine skier. She represented Sweden at the 1992 Winter Paralympic Games. She won a silver medal.

Career 
At the  1992 Winter Paralympic Games., she won a silver medal in Women's Slalom LW5/7,6/8. She competed in Women's Downhill LW5/7,6/8 finishing fifth, Women's Giant Slalom LW5/7,6/8 finishing seventh, and Women's Super-G LW5/7,6/8.

References 

Year of birth missing (living people)
Living people
Paralympic alpine skiers of Sweden
Swedish female alpine skiers
Alpine skiers at the 1992 Winter Paralympics
Medalists at the 1992 Winter Paralympics
Paralympic silver medalists for Sweden